The Rhynchodia are a subclass of ciliates in the class Phyllopharyngea.

References 

Phyllopharyngea
SAR supergroup subclasses